Profiler or profiling may refer to:

Profiler (TV series), an NBC television drama series about a criminologist profiler 
Profiler, a surface analysis instrument also called a profilometer
 Profiler, a fungicide containing fosetyl-Al and fluopicolide
Profiling (computer programming), a programming tool that can track the performance of another computer program
Offender profiling, or criminal profiling, work by  criminologists who study criminals' behavior for psychological clues to aid in capturing them
Wind profiler, an instrument to measure wind speed and direction at various elevations above the ground